The 1985 Sugar Bowl was the 51st edition of the college football bowl game, played at the Louisiana Superdome in New Orleans, Louisiana, on Tuesday, January 1. Part of the 1984–85 bowl game season, it matched the fifth-ranked Nebraska Cornhuskers of the Big Eight Conference and the #11 LSU Tigers of the Southeastern Conference (SEC). The teams had met two years earlier in the Orange Bowl. Favored Nebraska trailed early, but rallied to win 28–10.

Game summary
The game kicked off shortly after 7 p.m. CST, televised by ABC, at the same time as the Orange Bowl on NBC, which matched #2 Oklahoma and #4 Washington.

In the first quarter, Ronnie Lewis kicked a 37-yard field goal to give LSU an early lead.

In the third quarter, Sundberg scored on a nine-yard run to give the Huskers a  In the fourth quarter, Sundberg threw touchdown passes of 24 and 17 yards to tight end Todd Frain as Nebraska won 28–10. For his four touchdowns (three passing, one rushing) Sundberg was named the game' MVP.

Scoring
First quarter
LSU – Ronnie Lewis 37-yard field goal
Second quarter
LSU – Dalton Hilliard 2-yard run (Lewis kick)
Nebraska – Doug DuBose 31-yard pass from Craig Sundberg (Dale Klein kick)
Third quarter
Nebraska – Sundberg 9-yard run (Klein kick)
Fourth quarter
Nebraska – Todd Frain 24-yard pass from Sundberg (Klein kick)
Nebraska – Frain 17-yard pass from Sundberg (Klein kick)

Statistics
{| class=wikitable style="text-align:center"
! Statistics !!  Nebraska  !! LSU
|-
|align=left|First Downs || 23|| 19
|-
|align=left|Rushes–yards|| 59–280|| 34–183
|-
|align=left|Passing yards || 143 || 221
|-
|align=left|Passing (C–A–I) || 10–18–3 || 20–38–5
|-
|align=left|Total Offense || 77–423 || 72–404
|-
|align=left|Return yards ||16|| 15
|-
|align=left|Punts–average ||5–31|| 4–40
|-
|align=left|Fumbles–lost ||0–0|| 3–1
|-
|align=left|Turnovers||3||6
|-
|align=left|Penalties–yards ||9–74|| 5–36
|-
|align=left|Time of possession ||32:29||27:31
|}

Aftermath
Nebraska climbed one spot to fourth in the final AP poll, and LSU fell to fifteenth.

References

Sugar Bowl
Sugar Bowl
LSU Tigers football bowl games
Nebraska Cornhuskers football bowl games
Sugar Bowl
Sugar Bowl